The Stal-3 (Stal – steel) was a transport aircraft designed and built in the USSR from 1933.

Development
The Stal-3 was an enlarged development of the Stal-2, designed at the OOS (Otdel Opytnogo Samolyetostroeniya - section for experimental aircraft construction), with a simplified structure which reduced manufacturing man-hours and structural weight, whilst increasing the design load factor. The layout of the aircraft was very similar to the Stal-2, but featured larger dimensions, slotted flaps, a wide chord engine cowling, slotted ailerons, and spatted wheels with brakes, or skis depending on season.

Flight testing began in 1933 with acceptable results, leading to a production order for 79. The Stal-3 was an important aircraft with the GVF / Aeroflot until 1941, continuing to give service on utility duties with Aeroflot and the Soviet Air Force.

Operators

Mongolian People's Aviation

Aeroflot
Soviet Air Force

Specifications (Stal-3)

See also

References

 Gunston, Bill. “The Osprey Encyclopaedia of Russian Aircraft 1875 – 1995”. London, Osprey. 1995. 

1930s Soviet airliners
OOS aircraft